Jaden Christopher Syre Smith (born July 8, 1998), is an American rapper, singer, and actor. He has received various accolades, including a Teen Choice Award, an MTV Movie Award, a BET Award and a Young Artist Award, among nominations for a Grammy Award, two NAACP Image Awards and an Empire Award.

His film debut was with his father Will Smith in the 2006 film The Pursuit of Happyness, and he again appeared with his father in the 2013 film After Earth. He also starred in the remake films The Day the Earth Stood Still (2008) and The Karate Kid (2010). Following a three-year hiatus Smith returned to acting in 2016, starring in the two-part Netflix original The Get Down and a voice-acting role in the Netflix original anime Neo Yokio.

Smith began his musical career alongside Canadian singer Justin Bieber, when he was featured on the 2010 single "Never Say Never" from The Karate Kid. The song reached the top ten on the Billboard Hot 100 and was certified 5× Platinum in the US. He later released multiple mixtapes including CTV2 (2014). Following a three-year work effort, he released his debut studio album, Syre (2017). Smith has since released the studio albums Erys (2019) and CTV3: Cool Tape Vol. 3 (2020). In 2022, he received a Grammy Award for Album of the Year nomination as a featured artist on Bieber's album Justice.

Early life
Jaden Smith was born July 8, 1998, in Malibu, California, the son of actors Jada Pinkett Smith and Will Smith. He has an older half-brother, Trey Smith (born 1992) and a younger sister, Willow Smith (born 2000). Smith attended New Village Leadership Academy before being homeschooled by his parents. Growing up, Smith's celebrity status due to acting in films such as The Pursuit of Happyness and his parents both being acclaimed actors led to him being isolated from having a normal childhood, something he has spoken on at length. He took up skateboarding.

Smith and his siblings were youth ambassadors for Project Zambi, which provides assistance in conjunction with Hasbro for Zambian children orphaned by AIDS.

Career

Acting

Smith made his major role debut in the 2006 film The Pursuit of Happyness as Christopher, the son of Chris Gardner, Will Smith's character. For his role, Smith won the award for Breakthrough Performance at the 2007 MTV Movie Awards. Smith next appeared as Jacob in the 2008 Scott Derrickson science fiction film, The Day the Earth Stood Still, a remake of the 1951 classic of the same name.

In 2010, along with Jackie Chan, Smith starred in The Karate Kid, a remake of the 1984 film. In May 2013, Will Smith and Jaden starred together, playing father and son, in After Earth.  In 2014, it was announced that Smith will return for the sequel Karate Kid 2 with Jackie Chan. The movie will be directed by Breck Eisner, produced by James Lassiter and Will Smith and written by Zak Penn.

In April 2014, Smith was cast in the film The Good Lord Bird, which is based on the 2013 novel of the same name by James McBride. Smith plays Henry Shackleford, a young slave living in Kansas Territory in 1857 who encounters abolitionist John Brown.

Smith took a break from acting following the release of his mixtape, Cool Tape Vol. 2 to focus on music, returning to act in Netflix original, The Get Down in 2017. Smith also had a voice acting role in Neo Yokio and a role in Nashville as himself. Commenting on his break from acting, he said "The kinds of roles I was being offered weren't exactly what I was looking for, nothing felt really necessary that I needed to be in until this came along". Smith has returned to acting in films with the announcement of a film based on skateboarding. On June 21, 2018, Crystal Moselle's Skate Kitchen released its first official trailer showcasing Smith as the main character. The film was officially released on August 10, 2018, after being showcased at Sundance in Winter 2017. In 2020, he starred alongside Cara Delevingne in the romantic drama Life in a Year, to positive reviews.

Music

In 2010, Smith rapped alongside Canadian singer Justin Bieber in the song "Never Say Never". The song peaked at 8 on the Billboard Hot 100 and was certified 5× Platinum in the US.

On October 1, 2012, Jaden released his debut mixtape, The Cool Cafe. Smith released the sequel to The Cool Cafe on November 8, 2014, titled CTV2.

Smith started work on his debut studio album in 2014, a process that took three years. Smith announced in December 2016 that his debut studio album would be titled Syre. The lead single from Syre, "Fallen" was released on December 5, 2016, three more singles were released, "Batman" and "Watch Me" on July 14, 2017, and "Falcon" on November 16. Syre was released on November 17, 2017, and debuted at number 24 on the US Billboard 200. "Icon" was released as a single on the same day and reached  3 on the Bubbling Under Hot 100 Singles chart.

Smith later announced that his next project following Syre would be titled Erys on December 14, 2017. Another project named Syre: The Electric Album was later teased via Twitter. Leading up to the release of the project, Smith released the single "Ghost" featuring Christian Rich. On July 8, 2018, Smith released the project exclusively on Instagram on his 20th birthday. The project was later released four days later to streaming platforms. Syre: The Electric Album is a guitar-centric rework of Smith's studio album Syre and is influenced by Jimi Hendrix and The Beatles' Sgt Pepper's Lonely Hearts Club Band. Less than a year later, on July 5, 2019, Smith released his second studio album, Erys, and debuted at number 12 on the US Billboard 200.

On July 30, 2018, Smith was announced as an opener during J. Cole's KOD Tour alongside Young Thug and EarthGang and on August 2, performed for the first time at Lollapalooza. One of Smith's influences, Kid Cudi, stated that he would like to make an album with Smith, which Smith supported, saying that he would like to in the future during an interview on August 21, 2018.

On July 24, 2020, Smith released the single "Cabin Fever", from his third album CTV3: Cool Tape Vol. 3, which he described is a completion of the trilogy of the previous Cool tapes and "also kinda completing the trilogies of Syre and Erys at the same time". The album includes a collaboration with Smith's friend and previous collaborator Justin Bieber, on the song "Falling for You". On June 21, 2021, Jaden released the single "BYE". On August 27, 2021, Jaden released another version of the album CTV3: Day Tripper's Edition on all streaming platforms.

Musical artistry and influences
Smith's influences include Kid Cudi, Kanye West, Kurt Cobain and Tycho.  Smith also considers his father, Will Smith, as an inspiration saying "He started in music and transitioned to movies. I started with movies, and then I transitioned into making music – I look at him and use it as a blueprint of how good of a person he is, but not necessarily the success that he reached."

Other ventures
GQ described Smith as "in a league of his own" in terms of fashion and a "superstar who has taken fashion to an entirely different level". Smith has called Tyler the Creator, Batman and Poseidon his icons when it comes to fashion. Smith said that Tyler the Creator introduced him to the brand Supreme. Batman's dark, gothic scenery has influenced the clothing he has created through his brand MSFTSrep and his personal clothing style, wearing Batman protective armor to Kanye West's and Kim Kardashian's wedding and his prom. MSFTSrep's range includes hoodies, T-shirt, trousers and vests. In May 2013 Smith collaborated with a Korean designer, Choi Bum Suk, to create a pop-up store in which customers can buy clothes with their collaborated logos.

Smith raised controversy in 2016 after modeling in a womenswear campaign for Louis Vuitton wearing a skirt. Explaining his choice to wear a skirt, Smith said he was attempting to combat bullying, saying "In five years, when a kid goes to school wearing a skirt, he won't get beat up and kids won't get mad at him." Smith continued to wear womenswear throughout the rest of 2016. Smith was the first male model to model women's wear for Louis Vuitton. Smith created a denim-line with fashion brand G-Star in 2018.

Smith is a partner in spring water company Just Water starting when he was just twelve years old. Just Water is attempting to create a water filtration system that's cheap and can be used in poorer areas and nations and wants to later help with water infrastructure and creating more environmentally friendly construction methods by producing its own drywall. On August 27, 2018, Just Water launched officially in the UK.

Personal life
Smith's father, Will, revealed that his son sought an emancipation ruling, with the consent of his parents, as a present for his 15th birthday. Will revealed to the media that Smith's primary motivation is the establishment of his own residence and also explained that his children are not subject to strict parenting conduct: "We generally don't believe in punishment. From the time Jaden was five or six we would sit him down, and all he has to do is be able to explain why what he did was the right thing for his life." However, Smith and his father appeared together on The Ellen DeGeneres Show on May 15, 2013, and Smith said:

The thing that people don't get is everything at his house is free. So I can get anything and everything at his house, so I'm going to be there for 20, 30 more years. He [Will Smith] says that as soon as I have a movie that's bigger than one of his movies I can get my own house.

In June 2017, Smith moved out of his parents' house into a $4 million home in Hidden Hills.

Smith is an avid conspiracy theorist and his statements often generate controversy. This includes theories about the Illuminati, and tweets about chemtrails.

In 2013, Smith generated controversy when he criticized traditional education and advised people to drop out of school. Discussing teenagers who attend public school, Smith said "kids who go to normal school are so teenagery, so angsty."

Smith dated Sarah Snyder from 2015 to 2017. Snyder inspired numerous songs on Smith's debut album, Syre.

Smith is a vegetarian. He started a mobile restaurant providing free vegan dinners for the homeless (but where others pay when they dine). His vegan lifestyle caused his parents to stage an intervention, following a rapid decline in health that led to his skin turning gray. He was later diagnosed with lactose intolerance and celiac disease. His declining health, however, resulted in Smith returning to vegetarianism.

Beginning in November 2018, Smith has claimed that rapper Tyler, the Creator is his boyfriend. Tyler, who is bisexual, denied this claim. In the song "NOIZE" on Erys in 2019, Tyler revealed while rapping that their relationship claims were sarcastic.

Smith has been called a non-binary icon for his work in popular media challenging traditional gender roles. He is often seen in gender-fluid clothing, wearing dresses, skirts, and high-heels. For his Vogue Korea editorial in 2016, he attracted attention for wearing traditionally female attire: a black skirt, blue nail polish, and a flower in his hair. He has made public comments such as "If I Wanna Wear A Dress, Then I Will, And That Will Set The New Wave...". Smith is reported as saying that the reason he wanted to wear skirts was to ultimately help kids get bullied less in schools.

In 2023, Smith was the subject of an online death hoax after Facebook posts and YouTube videos claimed that he had passed away. Posts on various social media platforms claimed that Will Smith publicly announced the death of his son. This resulted in fans googling whether or not the younger Smith had passed away. Many of the posts were obviously faked as they referred to Jaden as being only 15 years old.

Discography

Studio albums 
Syre (2017)
Erys (2019)
CTV3: Cool Tape Vol. 3 (2020)

Tours

Headlining
 Vision Tour: A North American Journey (2018)

Co-headlining
 Willow & Erys Tour  (2019)

Supporting
 Fall Out Boy - Mania Tour (2017)
 J. Cole - KOD Tour (2018)
 Post Malone - Beerbongs & Bentleys Tour (2019)
 Tyler, the Creator - IGOR Tour (2019)
 Justin Bieber - Justice World Tour (2022)

Filmography

Film

Television

Notes

References

External links 
 
 

1998 births
Living people
21st-century American male actors
21st-century American male musicians
21st-century American rappers
African-American male actors
African-American male child actors
African-American male dancers
African-American male rappers
American conspiracy theorists
American male film actors
American male television actors
American people of Creole descent
Columbia Records artists
Male actors from California
Male actors from Los Angeles
People from Malibu, California
Rappers from Los Angeles
Will Smith
Alternative hip hop musicians
Emo rap musicians